Somatohelix is a genus of curvilinear, spiralling tubular fossil, 2–7 mm wide and 3–14 cm long, from the Ediacaran deposites of the South Australia that was originally interpreted as a trace fossil; a larger amount of better-preserved material since facilitated its reconstruction as the remains of an organism of uncertain nature. Modern analogues of organisms with a helical constructional morphology are found not only in disparate Kingdoms, but also in multiple domains.

See also
 Cloudina
 Corumbella
 Saarina
 Sinotubulites
 List of Ediacaran genera

References

Ediacaran life
Fossils of Australia